

Europe

Events
 The Sicilian School, Dolce Stil Novo, and later the Tuscan School mark the emergence of literary Italian

Works
 Huon of Bordeaux written ( 1216 to 1268)
 Nibelunglied written approximately 1180–1210
 Lucas de Tuy and others, Chronicon Mundi ("Great Chronicle of the World"); Spain
 King Horn, the oldest known English verse romance, is written around 1225
 Poema de Fernán González written between 1250 and 1266
 Le Récit d'un ménestrel de Reims written around 1260
 Roman de la Rose written by Guillaume de Lorris (around 1230) and Jean de Meun (around 1275)
 The Codex Regius, the manuscript in which the Poetic Edda is preserved, is written ( 1270s)
 Heinrich der Vogler compiles Dietrichs Flucht around 1280
 The Owl and the Nightingale perhaps composed around 1280 (but may be up to a century later)
 Havelok the Dane written in Middle English ( 1285–1290)
 Liber sex festorum beatae Virginis written by Gottfried von Hagenau 1293–1300
 Völsunga saga is written in the late 13th century
 Oral tradition of Robin Hood and the ballads of Robin Hood emerge in England

Poets
 Giacomo da Lentini, founder of the Sicilian School and author of the earliest known Sonnets
 Guido Guinizelli (d. before 1276)
 Guido Cavalcanti (c. 1255–1300)
 Hadewijch, Dutch woman mystic
 Cynddelw Brydydd Mawr, Welsh
 Ibn Sahl of Seville (1212/13–1251)
 John Peckham (d. 1292), Archbishop of Canterbury and probable author of Philomena
 Jacob van Maerlant (c. 1230/40–1288/1300), Flemish poet writing in Middle Dutch
 Konrad von Würzburg (d. 1287), German
 Scots-Gaelic crusaders and poets Muireadhach Albanach and Gillebríghde Albanach flourish at the beginning of the century

East Asia

China

Poets 
Lu You 陸游 (1125–1209), Southern Song dynasty poet

Japan

Works 
Japanese poetry anthologies:
 Shin Kokin Wakashū (also spelled "Shinkokinshu") the eighth Japanese imperial waka poetry anthology. Its name apparently aimed to show the relation and counterpart to Kokin Wakashū, ordered in 1201 by former Emperor Go-Toba, compiled by Fujiwara no Teika (whose first name is sometimes romanized as Sadaie), Fujiwara Ariie, Fujiwara Ietaka (Karyū), the priest Jakuren, Minamoto Michitomo, and Asukai Masatsune (completed in 1205)
 Shinchokusen Wakashū
 Shokugosen Wakashū
 Shokukokin Wakashū

Poets 
 Asukai Gayu 飛鳥井雅有, also known as "Asukai Masaari" (1241–1301), Kamakura period nobleman and poet; has 86 poems in the official anthology Shokukokin Wakashū
Eifuku-mon In 永福門院, also written "Eifuku Mon'in", also known as Saionji Shōko 西園寺しょう子, 西園寺鏱子 (1271–1342) Kamakura period poet and a consort of the 92nd emperor, Fushimi; she belonged to the Kyōgoku school of verse; has poems in the Gyokuyōshū anthology
Fujiwara no Ietaka 藤原家隆 (1158–1237), early Kamakura period waka poet; has several poems in the Shin Kokin Wakashū anthology; related by marriage to Jakuren; pupil of Fujiwara no Shunzei's
Fujiwara no Shunzei 藤原俊成, also known as "Fujiwara no Toshinari", "Shakua" 釈阿, "Akihiro" 顕広 (1114–1204), poet and nobleman, noted for his innovations in the waka poetic form and for compiling Senzai Wakashū ("Collection of a Thousand Years"), the seventh Imperial anthology of waka poetry,; father of Fujiwara no Teika; son of Fujiwara no Toshitada
Fujiwara no Tameie 藤原為家 (1198–1275), the central figure in a circle of poets after the Jōkyū War in 1221; second son of poets Teika and Abutuni
Fujiwara no Teika 藤原定家, also known as "Fujiwara no Sadaie" or "Sada-ie" (1162–1242), a widely venerated late Heian period and early Kamakura period waka poet and (for centuries) extremely influential critic; also a scribe, scholar and widely influential anthologist; the Tale of Matsura is generally attributed to him; son of Fujiwara no Shunzei; associated with Jakuren
Emperor Go-Toba, 後鳥羽天皇, also known as  山科僧正 (1180–1239)
Gyōi 行意 (1177–1217?), late Heian, early Kamakura period poet and Buddhist monk; one of the New Thirty-six Poetry Immortals; son of Fujiwara no Motofusa
 Jakuren 寂蓮, also known as "Fujiwara no Sadanaga" 藤原定長 before becoming a monk (1139–1202), initially adopted by Fujiwara no Shunzei, later stepped aside as Shunzei's heir and became a Buddhist priest; on the model of Saigyo, traveled around the country, composing poems; frequently associated with Fujiwara no Teika; one of six compilers of the eighth imperial waka anthology, Shin Kokin Wakashū, which contains 36 of his poems; adopted Fujiwara no Ietaka, a pupil of Shunzei's; has a poem in the Hyakunin Isshu anthology
Jakushitsu Genkō 寂室元光 (1290–1367), Rinzai Zen master, poet, flute player, and first abbot of Eigen-ji, which was constructed solely for him to teach Zen
Jien 慈円 (1155–1225) poet, historian, and Buddhist monk
Kamo no Chōmei 鴨長明 (1155–1216), author, waka poet and essayist 
 Sesson Yūbai 雪村友梅 (1290–1348), poet and Buddhist priest of the Rinzai sect who founded temples 
 Princess Shikishi 式子内親王 (d. 1201), late Heian and early Kamakura period poet, never-married daughter of Emperor Go-Shirakawa; entered service at the Kamo Shrine in Kyoto in 1159, later left the shrine, in later years a Buddhist nun; has 49 poems in the Shin Kokin Shū anthology
 Shunzei's Daughter, popular name of Fujiwara Toshinari no Musume 藤原俊成女、, also 藤原俊成卿女、皇(太)后宮大夫俊成(卿)女, 越部禅尼 (c. 1171 – c. 1252), called the greatest female poet of her day, ranked with Princess Shikishi; her grandfather was the poet Fujiwara no Shunzei
Ton'a 頓阿  also spelled as "Tonna"; lay name: Nikaidō Sadamune 二階堂貞宗 (1289–1372), poet and Buddhist monk

Korea
 U Tak (1262–1342)

Byzantine Empire 
 Aaron ben Joseph of Constantinople (c. 1260 – c. 1320)

Persia and Persian language

Persian-language poets
 Attar of Nishapur, poet (c. 1130 – c. 1230)
 Rumi, poet (1207–1273)
 Sultan Walad
 Saadi Shirazi, poet (1184–1283/1291?)
 Rashid-al-Din Hamadani, (1247–1318)
 Amir Khusrow
 Shams Tabrizi
 Ruzbihan Baqli
 Zahed Gilani
 Khwaju Kermani
 Mahmoud Shabestari
 Najm al-Din Razi
 Muhammad Aufi
 Qazi Beiza'i
 Awhadi Maraghai
 Auhaduddin Kermani
 Ghiyas al-Din ibn Rashid al-Din
 Ibn Yamin
 Ata-Malik Juvayni
 Sharaf al-Din Harun Juvayni

Arab world
 Busiri (Abū 'Abdallāh Muhammad ibn Sa'īd ul-Būsīrī Ash Shadhili, 1211–1294) writes Qaṣīda al-Burda ("Poem of the Mantle") in praise of the prophet Muhammad
 Ibn Sahl of Seville (1212–1251)
 Al-Shabb al-Zarif al-Tilimsani (d. 1289)

South Asia
 Andayya writes Kabbigara Kava ("Poets' Defender") (1217–1235) in Kannada
 Amir Khusro (1253–1325) writes poetry primarily in Persian, but also in Hindavi
 Dnyaneshwar (1275–1296) writes the Dnyaneshwari at age 15 or 16 and also the Amrutanubhav in Marathi (ovi metre) and his sister Muktabai (1279–1297) writes abhang poetry
 Changdev Maharaj writes abhang poetry in Marathi
 Raghavanka writes Harishchandra Kavya (c.1200 or c.1225) in Kannada
 Palkuriki Somanatha probably writes in Telugu, Kannada and Sanskrit

Sub-saharan Africa
 Period of the Epic of Sundiata, transmitted through oral tradition.

Decades and years

References

 01
Poetry by century